Schmitter is a surname. Notable people with the surname include:

People 
Netherlands
Thierry Schmitter, Dutch sailor
France
, French writer
United States
Charles Schmitter (1907–2002), American fencer and coach

See also
Schmitter Peak, a peak in the Prince Charles Mountains